George Elias Denley (August 9, 1867 - August 1942) was an American farmer, teacher, editor, and Democratic politician. He was a member of the Mississippi State Senate from 1928 to 1932, and a member of the Mississippi House of Representatives from 1916 to 1924.

Biography 
George Elias Denley was born on August 9, 1867, in Coles Creek, Mississippi. He was the son of James Denley and Margaret (Sellers) Denley. Denley attended the schools of Yalobusha County. He taught at school from 1887 to 1889 and from 1896 to 1900. In 1908, he became the editor and printer of a newspaper called the Coffeeville Courier. He was also a life insurance agent. He was a justice of the peace from 1895 to 1899 and he was a member of the Board of Supervisors of Yalobusha County from 1899 to 1907. In 1915, he was elected to represent Yalobusha County in the Mississippi House of Representatives and served from 1916 to 1920. He was re-elected in 1919 and served from 1920 to 1924. Denley then represented the 28th District in the Mississippi State Senate from 1928 to 1932. Denley died after a long illness in Grenada, Mississippi, in August 1942.

Personal life 
Denley married Martha Ellen Williams on January 7, 1892. They had eleven children, named Martha Essey, Margaret (Denley) Speir, Chester Lamar, Mary Jessie, Gladys Ethel, Sellers Vanhoozer, Nellie Tolise, Evelyn Grace, Gerald Hamilton, George Edwin, and Clara Lucile. Their son Sellers served in the Mississippi House of Representatives from 1940 to 1944.

References 

1867 births
1942 deaths
Democratic Party members of the Mississippi House of Representatives
Democratic Party Mississippi state senators
People from Coffeeville, Mississippi
Editors of Mississippi newspapers